Tracey Ilana Curro (born 27 November 1963 in Ingham, Queensland) is an Australian journalist.

Curro has previously been a news presenter on GMV-6, QTQ-9 and ATV-10 and a reporter on the Seven Network's Beyond 2000, a science-technology show, and correspondent on 60 Minutes.

Career 
Curro is a graduate of the Queensland University of Technology (Bachelor of Business – Communications) and the Institute of Strategic Leadership, New Zealand.

She was embroiled in a court case when she broke her contract with the producers of Beyond 2000 to join 60 Minutes: Curro v Beyond Productions Pty Ltd (1993) 30 NSWLR 337, decided 7 May 1993.

She can occasionally be heard filling in for regular presenters on 774 ABC Melbourne radio, notably filling in for a two-week period in 2005 following the departure of Virginia Trioli, and has written for The Australian Women's Weekly.

One of her prized moments of television occurred when she asked Pauline Hanson whether she was xenophobic. The famous response, "Please explain" has now become an Australia classic, and is a line for which Hanson is remembered.

Curro was also the Communications Manager for Sustainability Victoria—the greenhouse reduction arm of the Victorian Government. She is currently a Principal Consultant with executive recruitment firm SHK, specialising in marketing and communications, corporate and public affairs, government relations, internal communication and sustainability.

Curro previously filled in for National Nine News Melbourne weekend presenter Jo Hall, she also used to present weekly Crimestopper reports on the Nine Network.

She has also been a fill in presenter for Carrie Bickmore on The Project, and was particularly prominent on the show in 2010–11.

References

1963 births
Living people
Australian television presenters
Australian television journalists
Australian women television presenters
Australian women journalists
People from North Queensland
Queensland University of Technology alumni
60 Minutes correspondents